Suichuan County is a county in the southwest of Jiangxi province, People's Republic of China, bordering Hunan province to the southwest. It is under the jurisdiction of the prefecture-level city of Ji'an, and is its southernmost county-level division.

Administrative divisions
Nowadays, Suichuan County has 11 towns and 12 townships. 
11 towns

12 townships

Demographics 

Economy
Suichan County is one of the largest producers of kumquats in China.

Climate

Notes and references

External links
  [www.suichuan.gov.cn/ Government site] - 

 
County-level divisions of Jiangxi